The Malaysian honeyguide (Indicator archipelagicus) is a bird in the family Indicatoridae, which are paleotropical near passerine birds related to the woodpeckers. The species is native to Southeast Asia.

Description
It is a medium-sized, up to 18 cm long, olive-brown honeyguide with greenish streaks, reddish iris, thick grey bill and greyish white below. The male has a yellow patch on the shoulder, while the female has none. The young resembles the female with streaked underparts.

Habitat and range
The Malaysian honeyguide occurs throughout lowland broadleaved forests of western Thailand, Peninsular Malaysia, Borneo and the island of Sumatra.

Habits
The call of the Malaysian honeyguide is a cat-like "meow", followed by a rattling sound. The diet consists mainly of insects, especially wild bees and wasps. It nests in tree hollows.

Status
Due to ongoing habitat loss, local and sparse population, the Malaysian honeyguide is evaluated as Near Threatened on the IUCN Red List of Threatened Species.

References

External links 
 BirdLife Species Factsheet
 Image at ADW

Malaysian honeyguide
Malaysian honeyguide
Birds of Malaysia
Birds of Malesia
Malaysian honeyguide